Events in the year 1992 in Switzerland.

Incumbents
Federal Council:
Otto Stich 
Jean-Pascal Delamuraz 
Kaspar Villiger
Arnold Koller 
Flavio Cotti 
René Felber (President)
Adolf Ogi

Events
 Switzerland in the Eurovision Song Contest 1992.

Births

 7 January - Loris Benito.
 31 March - Henri Laaksonen.
 20 May - Enes Kanter Freedom, Swiss-born Turkish basketball player
 27 September - Granit Xhaka, footballer
 6 November - Simon Pellaud.

Deaths

8 April - Daniel Bovet.
28 June - Peter Hirt.
 20 August — Will Eisenmann, German-Swiss composer (born 1906)
29 August - Heini Hediger.

References

 
Years of the 20th century in Switzerland
1990s in Switzerland